Silvretta-Hochalpenstraße is a private toll road between Vorarlberg and Tirol owned and operated by Vorarlberger Illwerke.

The street was opened to the public in 1954.

Toll booths (entry/exit): 

See also 
 List of toll roads#Austria
 List of mountain passes

References

External links 

Silvretta Alps
Toll roads in Austria
Buildings and structures in Vorarlberg
Buildings and structures in Tyrol (state)
1954 establishments in Austria